Dodge Creek is a stream in Ste. Genevieve County in the U.S. state of Missouri.

Dodge Creek has the name of Israel Dodge, a pioneer citizen.

See also
List of rivers of Missouri

References

Rivers of Ste. Genevieve County, Missouri
Rivers of Missouri